

First round selections

The following are the first round picks in the 1981 Major League Baseball draft.

Compensation Picks

Other notable players 
Darrin Jackson, 2nd round, 28th overall by the Chicago Cubs
Mike Gallego, 2nd round, 33rd overall by the Oakland Athletics
Mark Gubicza†, 2nd round, 34th overall by the Kansas City Royals
Mark Langston†, 2nd round, 35th overall by the Seattle Mariners
Frank Viola†, 2nd round, 37th overall by the Minnesota Twins
Neal Heaton†, 2nd round, 39th overall by the Cleveland Indians
Sid Bream, 2nd round, 48th overall by the Los Angeles Dodgers
John Elway, 2nd round, 52nd overall by the New York Yankees
Phil Bradley†, 3rd round, 53rd overall by the Seattle Mariners
Tony Gwynn‡, 3rd round, 58th overall by the San Diego Padres
Sid Fernandez†, 3rd round, 73rd overall by the Los Angeles Dodgers
David Cone†, 3rd round, 74th overall by the Kansas City Royals
Curt Young, 4th round, 92nd overall by the Oakland Athletics
Paul O'Neill†, 4th round, 93rd overall by the Cincinnati Reds
Todd Benzinger, 4th round, 96th overall by the Boston Red Sox
Shane Mack, 4th round, 100th overall by the Kansas City Royals, but did not sign
Eric Plunk, 4th round, 103rd overall by the New York Yankees
Bip Roberts, 5th round, 117th overall by the Pittsburgh Pirates, but did not sign
Mickey Tettleton†, 5th round, 118th overall by the Oakland Athletics
Bill Wegman, 5th round, 124th overall by the Milwaukee Brewers
John Franco†, 5th round, 125th overall by the Los Angeles Dodgers
Devon White†, 6th round, 132nd overall by the California Angels
Alvin Davis†, 6th round, 144th overall by the Oakland Athletics, but did not sign
Mike Pagliarulo, 6th round, 155th overall by the New York Yankees
Mark McGwire†, 8th round, 199th overall by the Montreal Expos, but did not sign
Steve Lombardozzi, 9th round, 218th overall by the Minnesota Twins
Fred McGriff†, 9th round, 233rd overall by the New York Yankees
Roger Clemens†, 12th round, 289th overall by the New York Mets, but did not sign
Lenny Dykstra†, 13th round, 315th overall by the New York Mets
Danny Cox, 13th round, 319th overall by the St. Louis Cardinals
Bob Tewksbury†, 19th round, 493rd overall by the New York Yankees
Matt Nokes†, 20th round, 503rd overall by the San Francisco Giants
Vince Coleman, 20th round, 513th overall by the Philadelphia Phillies, but did not sign
Chris Bosio, 29th round, 722nd overall by the Pittsburgh Pirates, but did not sign
Lance Johnson, 30th round, 742nd overall by the Pittsburgh Pirates, but did not sign
Cecil Fielder, 31st round, 767th overall by the Baltimore Orioles, but did not sign

† All-Star  
‡ Hall of Famer

NFL players drafted
John Elway, 2nd round, 52nd overall by the New York Yankees
Jack Del Rio, 22nd round, 550th overall by the Toronto Blue Jays, but did not sign

Notes

External links 
Complete draft list from The Baseball Cube database

References 

Major League Baseball draft
Draft
Major League Baseball draft